(甲骨学) is a humanities discipline that focuses on the Chinese Upper Antiquity oracle characters. Oracle bone science can be divided into a narrow sense of oracle bone science and a broad sense of oracle bone science. In the narrow sense, the study of oracle bone script is limited to the study of oracle bone script itself, and it is a discipline of paleography. This includes the integration of theories, research methods and materials from various disciplines, such as paleography, history, archaeology, historical culture, historical literature, and cultural anthropology, to thoroughly study the historical and cultural background of the oracle bones and some of the patterns of the oracle bone divination. It is a diversified and specialized discipline. In the early days of oracle bone discovery, oracle bones were called "qiwen", and the study of oracle bones was called "qiology". In 1931, Zhou Yitong proposed for the first time that "oracle bone science" was an independent discipline. Wang Yuxin emphasized that oracle bones are precious cultural relics and historical materials left over from the ancient period, but their value for archaeological and historical research lies in orthography beyond script interpretation, which has become increasingly recognized by scholars as orthography develops. Oracle bone science is a systematic and scientific inquiry into the inherent laws of the oracle bone script itself and uses it as a basis for glimpsing the history, society, and customs of the ancient world. The oracle bones should not be confused with orthography.

The oracle bones on display at the National Archives Library

See Also 

 Bone divination
 Oracle bone script

References

Bibliography 

 《中國甲骨學史》，吳浩坤、潘悠 著，上海人民出版社1985年12月初版，2006年10月重印，ISBN 7208064751

Oraculology
Pages with unreviewed translations